Muskerry is a central region of County Cork, Ireland which incorporates the baronies of Muskerry West and Muskerry East. It is located along the valley of the River Lee and is bounded by the Boggeragh Mountains to the north and the Shehy Mountains to the south. The region is named after the Múscraige, who were an important Érainn people of Munster. It is also the name of an official Gaeltacht region in which Munster Irish is spoken. Gaeltacht villages include Béal Átha an Ghaorthaidh, Baile Bhuirne, Cúil Aodha and Cill na Martra. Major population centres include Ballincollig, Blarney and Macroom.

See also
 Múscraige, the ancient name for the area and people
 MacCarthy of Muskerry, the great dynasty
 Viscount Muskerry and Earl of Clancarty
 Baron Muskerry
 Cork and Muskerry Light Railway
 Saint Gobnait
 Saint Cyra
 Donegan (disambiguation)

Further reading

References

Geography of County Cork
MacCarthy dynasty